Jehad Al-Zowayed (born 11 January 1989) is a Saudi professional footballer who currently plays as a winger or an attacking midfielder for Al-Taraji.

Honours
Al-Hazem
MS League: 2020–21

References

External links
 

Saudi Arabian footballers
1989 births
Living people
Hajer FC players
Al-Fateh SC players
Khaleej FC players
Al-Fayha FC players
Al-Faisaly FC players
Al-Nahda Club (Saudi Arabia) players
Al-Adalah FC players
Al-Bukayriyah FC players
Abha Club players
Al-Hazem F.C. players
Al-Sahel SC (Saudi Arabia) players
Al-Taraji Club players
Saudi First Division League players
Saudi Professional League players
Saudi Second Division players
Association football midfielders
Saudi Arabian Shia Muslims